Koellensteinia is a genus of flowering plants from the orchid family, Orchidaceae. It is named by Heinrich Gustav Reichenbach for the Captain Carl Kellner von Koellenstein, an Austrian military officer and a botanical correspondent of Reichenbach.

Distribution and ecology
The genus contains about 19 species native to South America, Belize, Trinidad and Puerto Rico. Terrestrial or epiphytic plants found in low to mid elevation, hill and mountain forests.

Characteristics
Related to Zygopetalum. Stems short, leafy, usually forming pseudobulbs, 1- to 3-leaved. Leaves petiolate, linear to oblong, narrow, pleated, lightly veined. Inflorescence lateral, erect, slender, branched or unbranched, numerous to few-flowered. Flowers small to medium sized, fragrant, yellow or white, barred magenta, rose or violet and suffused pink on the outside. Sepals and petals subsimilar, free, spreading; lip trilobed with spreading or erect, small side lobes, a larger, broad midlobe that is entire or somewhat bilobed and has a bilobed, erect callus. Column with a conspicuous foot, very short, sometimes winged; pollinia 2 or 4.

Cultivation
Require intermediate conditions, moderate shade, and high humidity. The plants can be grown potted in a free-draining bark mixture and should not be allowed to dry out completely for any length of time.

Species
Currently 11 species are accepted:
Koellensteinia carraoensis Garay & Dunst. - Brazil North, French Guiana, Suriname, Venezuela 
Koellensteinia dasilvae C.F.Hall & F.Barros - Brazil North
Koellensteinia eburnea (Barb.Rodr.) Schltr. - Bolivia, Brazil Southeast, Brazil West-Central
Koellensteinia florida (Rchb.f.) Garay - Brazil Northeast, Brazil Southeast
Koellensteinia graminea (Lindl.) Rchb.f. - Trinidad, Bolivia, Brazil North, Brazil Northeast, Colombia, Ecuador, French Guiana, Guyana, Peru, Suriname, Trinidad-Tobago, Venezuela
Koellensteinia hyacinthoides Schltr. - Brazil North, Colombia, Guyana, Suriname, Venezuela
Koellensteinia ionoptera Linden & Rchb.f. - Peru, Ecuador
Koellensteinia kellneriana Rchb.f. - Venezuela, French Guiana, Suriname, Colombia, Brazil North, Guyana
Koellensteinia lilijae Foldats - Panama, Venezuela
Koellensteinia spiralis Gomes Ferreira & L.C.Menezes - Bahia
Koellensteinia tricolor (Lindl.) Rchb.f. in W.G.Walpers - Belize, Guyana, Venezuela, Brazil North

See also
 List of Orchidaceae genera

References

 Pridgeon, A.M., Cribb, P.J., Chase, M.A. & Rasmussen, F. eds. (1999). Genera Orchidacearum 1. Oxford Univ. Press.
 Pridgeon, A.M., Cribb, P.J., Chase, M.A. & Rasmussen, F. eds. (2001). Genera Orchidacearum 2. Oxford Univ. Press.
 Pridgeon, A.M., Cribb, P.J., Chase, M.A. & Rasmussen, F. eds. (2003). Genera Orchidacearum 3. Oxford Univ. Press
 Berg Pana, H. 2005. Handbuch der Orchideen-Namen. Dictionary of Orchid Names. Dizionario dei nomi delle orchidee. Ulmer, Stuttgart

External links

Zygopetalinae genera
Zygopetalinae